Vasyl Herasymenko was a Soviet military leader from Ukraine who was nominally and temporarily appointed the People's Commissar of Defense of the Ukrainian SSR in 1944-45.

Biography
Vasyl Herasymenko was born in a village of Velyka Burimka, Poltava Governorate (today part of Zolotonosha Raion, Cherkasy Oblast) on April 24, 1900 in a peasant family. When he was nine years of age, together with mother they moved to relatives in Kuban, stanytsia Berezanska. There Herasymenko finished a village school and the Nkil city college in Yekaterinodar.

In 1918 Herasymenko joined the Red Army and during the Russian Civil War he fought at the Northern Caucasus and the Southern Russia. In 1920 Herasymenko joined the Communist Party of the Soviet Union and in 1922 he finished the courses of commanding staff of the Red Army. In 1927 Herasymenko also finished the Joint Military School in Minsk and in 1931 - the M. V. Frunze Military Academy. In 1937 Herasymenko was commissioned as a commander of the 8th Rifle Corps. In 1938 he was a deputy commander of the Kiev Special Military District (see Kiev Military District). During World War II in July 1940 Herasymenko was appointed the commander of Volga Military District. At that time he was promoted to the Lieutenant General. In 1940 under the command of Georgi Zhukov participated in the invasion of Romania as a commander of the 5th Army.

At the start of the German invasion of the Soviet Union in 1941, Herasymenko commanded the 21st Army and the 13th Army at the Western Front. In the fall of the same year he was transferred to the Reserve Front staff personnel. In December 1941 Herasymenko was appointed the commander of Stalingrad Military District. In September 1942 - November 1943 he commanded the 28th Army that participated in the Rostov operation and the Melitopol Offensive as well as the Donbas Strategic Offensive. In January 1944 Herasymenko was appointed the commander of Kharkiv Military District forces, but already in March 1944 he was appointed the commander of Kiev Military District and the People's Commissar of Defense of the Ukrainian SSR. The decree of Ukrainian parliament Presidium was signed on March 11, 1944 and legalized the decision that was adopted by the Stavka of Commander-in-Chief and the State Defense Committee (both headed by Stalin).

On November 13, 1945 on decision of Stalin as the Supreme commander of Armed Forces of the Soviet Union Lieutenant General Herasymenko was dismissed from the post of narkom and district commander and transferred to Riga where he stayed until September 1953 as part of the Baltic Military District staff personnel. In 1949 Herasymenko finished the higher academic courses at the Voroshilov Military Academy. In 1953 he was dismissed to reserves due to his health.

References

External links
  Kucheruk, O. ''State without the army. Military-Historic Almanac. 2001.

Soviet lieutenant generals
1900 births
1961 deaths
People from Cherkasy Oblast
People from Poltava Governorate
Frunze Military Academy alumni
Soviet defence ministers of Ukraine
Soviet military personnel of the Russian Civil War
Soviet military personnel of World War II from Ukraine
Communist Party of the Soviet Union members
Recipients of the Order of Lenin
Recipients of the Order of the Red Banner
Recipients of the Order of Suvorov, 1st class
Recipients of the Order of Kutuzov, 2nd class